Mat Mathews, born Mathieu Hubert Wijnandts Schwarts (June 18, 1924 – February 12, 2009), was a Dutch jazz accordionist.

Early life
Mathews was born in The Hague and learned to play accordion while the Netherlands was still under the Nazi rule during World War II. After hearing Joe Mooney on a radio broadcast after the war, he decided to play jazz.

Later life and career
Mathews moved to New York in 1952 and formed a quartet which included Herbie Mann. He also worked with Kenny Clarke, Art Farmer, Percy Heath, Carmen McRae, Oscar Pettiford, Joe Puma, Milt Jackson and Julius Watkins. He worked mainly as a session musician in the late 1950s, and returned to the Netherlands in 1964, where he worked as an arranger, session musician, and record producer. In the 1970s, he worked in the US with Charlie Byrd, Doug Duke, Marian McPartland, and Clark Terry.

Discography
 Mat Mathews (Brunswick, 1953)
 The Modern Art of Jazz (Dawn, 1956)
 Accordion Solos (Brunswick, 1956)
 Eddie Costa, Mat Mathews & Don Elliott at Newport (Verve, 1957)
 Swingin' Pretty and All That Jazz (1959)
 Meditation (Jazz World, 1995)
 Live at Music Room (1996)
 The Gentle Art of Love (2004)

As sideman
With Carmen McRae
 Carmen McRae (Bethlehem, 1955)

References

1924 births
2009 deaths
Dutch jazz musicians
Jazz accordionists
Musicians from The Hague
20th-century accordionists